United Nations Security Council Resolution 2028 was unanimously adopted on 21 December 2011 after recalling resolution 338 (1973).

See also 
List of United Nations Security Council Resolutions 2001 to 2100

References

External links 
Full text of UNSCR 2028

 2028
December 2011 events
History of the Middle East